Arthur McArthur (19 May 1884 – ?) was an Australian politician. He was the Labor member for East Torrens in the South Australian House of Assembly from 1930 to 1933.

References

1884 births
Year of death missing
Members of the South Australian House of Assembly
Place of birth missing
Australian Labor Party members of the Parliament of South Australia